Jayne Margaret Jagot is an Australian judge. She has been a Justice of the High Court of Australia since 17 October 2022. She was previously a judge of the Federal Court of Australia and before that of the Land and Environment Court of New South Wales.

Early life and education
Jagot was born in England, and migrated to Australia with her family in 1968. Jagot studied at Baulkham Hills High School before receiving an arts degree from Macquarie University in 1987. She subsequently received a law degree with first-class honours from the University of Sydney in 1991. While at the University of Sydney, she won the Butterworths Prize for Most Proficient in First Year, the Pitt Cobbett Prize for Administrative Law, the Sir Alexander Beattie Prize in Company Law, the Margaret Ethel Peden Prize in Real Property, the Minter Ellison Prize in Intellectual Property, and the Nancy Gordon Smith Prize for Honours.

Career
Jagot worked as a solicitor with Mallesons Stephen Jaques (now King & Wood Mallesons) from 1992 to 2002, specialising in planning and environmental law. She was promoted to partner in 1997. She was admitted to the bar in 2002, after which she developed a successful practice as a barrister.

Land and Environment Court
Jagot was appointed as a Judge of the Land and Environment Court of New South Wales in 2006. She also served as an acting judge of the Equity Division of the Supreme Court of New South Wales for a period.

Federal Court
Jagot was appointed as a Judge of the Federal Court of Australia on 3 September 2008.

High Court
On 17 October 2022, Jagot was sworn in as a Justice of the High Court of Australia, replacing the retiring Justice Patrick Keane. On Jagot's appointment, the High Court of Australia had a majority of female Justices for the first time in its history.

Personal life
Jagot is married to former New South Wales Supreme Court judge and royal commissioner Peter McClellan.

See also
List of Justices of the High Court of Australia
List of Judges of the Federal Court of Australia

References 

English emigrants to Australia
Living people
Judges of the Federal Court of Australia
Australian women judges
Macquarie University alumni
People educated at Baulkham Hills High School
Sydney Law School alumni
Judges of the Supreme Court of the Australian Capital Territory
21st-century Australian judges
Year of birth missing (living people)
21st-century women judges